Tuckerman is a city in Jackson County, Arkansas, United States. The population was 1,862 at the 2010 census.

Each year on the second weekend of May, Tuckerman hosts Hometown Days, for the town and fundraiser for the Tuckerman Volunteer Ambulance Service.

Geography

Demographics

2020 census

As of the 2020 United States census, there were 1,707 people, 857 households, and 537 families residing in the city.

2000 census
As of the census of 2000, there were 1,757 people, 769 households, and 519 families residing in the city. The racial makeup of the city was 89.70% White, 8.71% Black or African American, 0.80% Native American, and 0.80% from two or more races.  0.91% of the population were Hispanic or Latino of any race.

There were 769 households, out of which 25.9% had children under the age of 18 living with them, 50.3% were married couples living together, 13.5% had a female householder with no husband present, and 32.5% were non-families. 30.7% of all households were made up of individuals, and 17.8% had someone living alone who was 65 years of age or older.  The average household size was 2.28 and the average family size was 2.83.

In the city, the population was spread out, with 22.6% under the age of 18, 7.5% from 18 to 24, 26.5% from 25 to 44, 23.7% from 45 to 64, and 19.6% who were 65 years of age or older.  The median age was 41 years. For every 100 females, there were 87.1 males.  For every 100 females age 18 and over, there were 87.6 males.

The median income for a household in the city was $27,000, and the median income for a family was $33,512. Males had a median income of $27,750 versus $19,621 for females. The per capita income for the city was $13,803.  About 10.8% of families and 14.2% of the population were below the poverty line, including 13.5% of those under age 18 and 19.8% of those age 65 or over.

Education 
Tuckerman is the home of the Jackson County School District and Tuckerman High School. The school district formed on July 1, 1993 due to the merger of the Tuckerman School District and the Grubbs School District.

Infrastructure

Notable people
 Bob Barner, Author/Illustrator of many books for children. Born in Tuckerman, childhood in Eastlake, Ohio.
 Jim Barnes, basketball player, Olympic gold medalist, top pick of 1964 NBA draft.
 Bobby Winkles, baseball coach at Arizona State University and in Major League Baseball.

References

Cities in Jackson County, Arkansas
Cities in Arkansas